Lithocarpus ruminatus, the ruminate stone oak, is a species of stone oak, native to the island of Borneo.

References

ruminatus
Endemic flora of Borneo
Flora of Sabah